Harold Dunbar Cooley (July 26, 1897 – January 15, 1974) was an American politician of the Democratic Party. He represented the Fourth Congressional district of North Carolina from 1934 to 1966.

Background
He was born on July 26, 1897 in Nashville, North Carolina. He was a graduate of the University of North Carolina at Chapel Hill and Yale University Law School.

Career

He was a private practice lawyer and military veteran, serving in the United States Naval Aviation Flying Corps during World War I. He was a member of the Interparliamentary Conferences held at Cairo, Egypt, 1947 and at Rome, Italy, 1948 and served as president of the American group for two four-year terms.

On July 7, 1934, he was elected as a Democrat to the Seventy-third Congress by special election to fill the vacancy caused by the death of United States Representative Edward W. Pou. He was subsequently reelected 16 times, serving until his resignation on December 30, 1966. Cooley remains the longest-serving Chairman of the House Committee on Agriculture in history. In 1947-8, he served on the Herter Committee.   He was one of the few Southern Congressmen not to sign the 1956 Southern Manifesto that opposed the desegregation of public schools ordered by the Supreme Court in Brown v. Board of Education. However, Cooley voted against the Civil Rights Act of 1957, the original version of the Civil Rights Act of 1960 (while abstaining on the final version), the Civil Rights Act of 1964, the 24th Amendment to the U.S. Constitution, and the Voting Rights Act of 1965.

He was nearly defeated in 1964 by Republican James Carson Gardner and then lost to Gardner by a stunning 13-point upset in 1966.

Death
He died on January 15, 1974, in Wilson, N.C. and is buried in Forest Hill Cemetery, Nashville, N.C.

Legacy
His home at Nashville, the Bissette-Cooley House, was listed on the National Register of Historic Places in 1985.

References

External links
 Inventory of the Harold Dunbar Cooley Papers, in the Southern Historical Collection, UNC-Chapel Hill
 https://web.archive.org/web/20110829181738/http://www.fff.org/freedom/0498d.asp

1897 births
1974 deaths
Democratic Party members of the United States House of Representatives from North Carolina
North Carolina lawyers
United States Naval Aviators
Yale Law School alumni
20th-century American politicians
People from Nashville, North Carolina
20th-century American lawyers